The 2020-21 Ethiopian Premier League is the 74th season of top-tier football in Ethiopia (22nd season as the Premier League). The season started on December 12, 2020. The first round of matches were held at Addis Abeba and Jimma Stadiums, while the second round of matches were held at Bahir Dar, Dire Dawa and Hawassa stadiums.

League table

Top scorers

References

Premier League
Ethiopia
Ethiopian Premier League